Stanhopea wardii is a species of orchid found from Nicaragua to Venezuela.

References

External links 

wardii
Orchids of Venezuela
Orchids of Nicaragua